Schofields is a suburb on the fringe of Sydney's urban sprawl, in the state of New South Wales, Australia. It is part of Greater Western Sydney's North West Growth Area.

Demographics
As at the 2016 Census, Schofields had an estimated population of 4,983. In 2001, Schofields had an estimated population of 3,012. Over the 15-year period, Schofield's population increased by 65.4%. The suburb is on the rural-urban fringe of Sydney, and is expanding rapidly. It is in the NSW Government's North West Growth Area. Schofields has numerous housing developments underway, which are expected to provide over 2,950 new homes.

The most common religion in Schofields is Catholicism (30.8%). The second largest religion is No Religion (17.7%). The most spoken language in Schofields is English, with Hindi being the second most spoken language at 3.7%. The majority of people from Schofields identified as Australian (21.3%), followed closely by English (20.4%). The third largest ancestry was Indian at 8.4%.

History

Early history of Schofields

John Schofield (1803–1884) was transported from England to the Colony of New South Wales for stealing when he was just 17 years old. At the time he was a silk weaver from Cheshire. In 1828, Schofield was granted a Ticket of Leave, which allowed him to live freely within the district of Parramatta. In 1829, he married Bridget Harley, the daughter of his former employer. Schofield then rented Gillingham Farm, located near the Eastern Creek.

The Schofields delivered eight offspring; five males and three females. In 1841, Schofield bought three  blocks of land along the Windsor Road. Unfortunately, due to falling wool prices and a general state of depression in the colony, Schofield became bankrupt in 1843. New government concessions introduced a few years later allowed Schofield to buy  of land around the area now known as Schofields in 1845. In 1849, Schofield and two of his sons, William and Samuel, sailed to California in the hope of finding gold. He returned in 1850 with some gold, but their ship, the Rosetta Joseph struck land and became ship wrecked. Aboard life-boats and in very rough seas, the passengers were rescued at  after ten days. Schofield and his sons returned to their farm with enough gold to pay off most of his debts. Just before Christmas in 1851, Bridget Schofield died. The discovery of gold in New South Wales and a rise in the economy provided Schofield with enough money to pay off his mortgage and develop his keen interest in horseracing.

In 1872, a stopping place was recognized on Schofield's land and a small platform made from railway sleepers was built after that to make boarding the train safer. This platform was known as Schofield's Siding. The name changed over the years to Schofields.

In his later life, Schofield set up a sawmill beside the railway line and used the trees from his paddocks in Schofields to supply timber for housing. John Schofield died in 1884.

Modern history
The suburb boundaries of Schofields were changed in November 2020, resulting in the creation of new suburbs of Nirimba Fields and Tallawong in the south and northeast respectively.

Parks, recreation and essential services
Schofields Park, on Station Street, is the home of the Riverstone Schofields Junior Soccer Football Club and Schofields Cricket Club.

The village also has a Community Hall that can be hired out for parties and is also regularly used by the local Church Group on Sunday mornings.

The village also has a NSW Rural Fire Service brigade, known as Schofields Bush Fire Brigade. They regularly attend house fires, car accidents, bush fires and most other emergencies in the area that require fire brigade attendance. A Woolworths Supermarket opened up across the road from the new Schofields railway station. Schofields Village Shopping Centre was completed in mid 2021 also across the road from the train station will include a Coles Supermarket and speciality stores.

The suburb was also home to the former Schofields Aerodrome and HMAS Nirimba and is now the suburb of Nirimba Fields.

Transport
Schofields railway station is on the Richmond branch of the T1 North Shore & Western Line and T5 Cumberland Line of the Sydney Trains network.

The Westlink M7 and M2 Hills Motorway provide easy road access from both the south and the east.

Busways provide commuter bus services to/from the suburb.

Places of worship 
Lankarama Buddhist Vihara (Sri Lankan Buddhist Temple) is located on Oak Street.

References

Further reading

External links
Revised suburb boundary of Schofields (November 2020) - Blacktown City Council

Suburbs of Sydney
City of Blacktown